Birley is a common English surname, and may refer to any of the following people:

Andrew Birley (born 1974), British archaeologist, son of Robin Birley (archaeologist) and Patricia Birley 
Anthony Birley (1937–2020), Professor of Ancient History at University of Manchester (1974–90), son of Eric Birley
Caroline Birley (1851–1907), English geologist, niece of Hugh Birley
Dawn Birley (born 1977), Canadian taekwondo practitioner and actress 
Derek Birley (1926–2002), English educator and writer
Eric Birley (1906–1995), British historian and archaeologist, great-grandson of Hugh Hornby Birley
Francis Birley (1850–1910), England international footballer who won the FA Cup three times, nephew of Hugh Birley
Hugh Birley (1817–1883), Conservative Party Member of Parliament for Manchester from 1868 to 1883, nephew of Hugh Hornby Birley
Hugh Hornby Birley (1778–1845), leading Manchester Tory who is reputed to have led the fatal charge of troops at the Peterloo Massacre 
India Jane Birley (born 1961), British artist and businessperson, daughter of Mark Birley 
Mark Birley (1930–2007), British entrepreneur and founder of Annabel's nightclub, son of Oswald Birley
Mathew Birley (born 1986), English professional footballer
Oswald Birley (1880–1952), British portrait painter, great-grandson of Hugh Hornby Birley 
Patricia Birley (born 1948), British archaeologist, wife of Robin Birley (archaeologist)
Patrick Birley (born 1965), chief executive of European Climate Exchange, son of Robin Birley (archaeologist)
Robert Birley (1903–1982), English educationalist who was headmaster of Charterhouse School and Eton College, and an anti-Apartheid campaigner
Robin Birley (businessman) (born 1958), English businessman and political activist, son of Mark Birley
Robin Birley (archaeologist) (born 1935), British archaeologist, son of Eric Birley

External links
Birley family genealogy